Shalimar Express is a passenger train operated daily by Pakistan Railways between Karachi and Lahore. The train named after the historic Shalimar Gardens in Lahore.

History
The Shalimar Express was inaugurated in 1979 by the President Muhammad Zia-ul-Haq. The train at that time only consisted of 2 parlour coaches and had only two stops and covered the  distance from Karachi to Lahore in 16 hours. Pakistan Railways suspended Shalimar Express on 27 July 2010 because it was running in loss. After 19 months of its suspension Pakistan Railways restarted it with the collaboration of a private company Air Rail Services on 24 February 2012. Shalimar Express currently consists of seven economy, two AC lower, one parlour car, one dining car, one power van and one luggage van coaches. The train now covers the  distance from Karachi to Lahore in 19 hours.

Shalimar Express was the first ever all air-conditioned train to run on the Pakistan Railway network. It consisted of 14 parlour coaches, two double capacity power vans and a dining car. The parlour coaches were manufactured in Pakistan carriage factory, through the acquisition of German rail technology. Each coach consisted of 52 reclining seats, with comfortable room space and two main televisions (that was installed in 1987). In short, the coach interiors was replicated to match that of an aeroplane. Shalimar Express got the first ever signature Pakistan Railway livery, that is used to date. It consisted of two dark green strips with a yellow middle livery, while the windows of the train were tinted black to avoid heat and sunlight to enter the coaches.

For over eight years since the train's inauguration, the train had two stops along it 1263 km route between Lahore and Karachi, which were Rohri and Khanewal. The train covered its distance in 16 hours and for a few years, it even covered it in just 15 hours and 25 minutes. The train began its journey at 6:00 am both ways and reached either destination at 10:00 pm the same day. Between 1987 and 1994, Multan was also added to its stop (earlier, it used to bypass Multan by taking the Khanewal-Jahania-Lodhran route), during which the train began journey at 7:00 am either side.

Initially the train was hauled by a 3000 horse power locomotive, imported from the General Motors company (EMD), United States in 1975. However, after the import of Hitachi Bombardier series from Japan in 1982, the GM engine retired and the new locomotives were put to work. Since the Hitachi engines were just 2000 HP each, two units were deployed to haul the Shalimar Express, but their poor quality led to a disruption and delay in the train service causing agitation among the passengers. Later in 1985, new EMD locomotives were imported, this time manufactured in the Henschel factory in Germany, that were used to pull the Shalimar Express.

Route 
 Karachi Cantonment–Lahore Junction via Karachi–Peshawar Railway Line

Station stops 
Karachi Cantonment
Hyderabad Junction
Nawabshah
Rohri Junction
Rahim Yar Khan
Khanpur
Bahawalpur
Multan Cantonment
Khanewal Junction
Sahiwal
Raiwind Junction
Lahore Junction

Incidents
 2013: Three passengers were killed and 15 were injured after an explosion ripped through a compartment of the Karachi-bound Shalimar Express at Chutiana railway station on 5 August 2013.
 2017: Two people were killed and 10 injured after the Karachi-bound Shalimar Express collided with an oil tanker at a level crossing near Sheikhupura. The accident occurred as the railway crossing's barrier was left opened. The engine and five bogies of the train, including the luggage compartment, and a power plant caught fire in the accident.

References

Named passenger trains of Pakistan
Passenger trains in Pakistan